Cesar Romero (1907–1994) was an American actor and activist.

Cesar Romero may also refer to:

César Romero (footballer, born 1980), Brazilian football midfielder
César Romero (soccer, born 1989), American soccer forward
César Romero (footballer, born 1999), Honduran football forward